Gourmet Detective is an American-Canadian series of made-for-television mystery films based on a book series of the same name from author Peter King that stars Dylan Neal as Henry Ross, a chef turned culinary sleuth and Brooke Burns as Detective Maggie Price. Set in San Francisco, it airs on Hallmark Movies & Mysteries in the US.

Cast
Dylan Neal as Henry "Gourmet Detective" Ross, a charming, single chef, gourmet consultant, and famous blogger. While assisting the police in investigating a murder at a restaurant, he demonstrates a useful investigative insight, and becomes an official police consultant on relevant cases. 
Brooke Burns as Detective Maggie Price, a leading detective with the Homicide Division in the San Francisco Police Department
Matthew Kevin Anderson as Munro, part of Detective Price's team
Marc Senior as Bailey, part of Detective Price's team
Samantha Ferris as Captain Forsyth, Captain of the Homicide Division and Maggie's boss who first hires Henry as a consultant on one of the cases
Ali Skovbye as Abigail, Maggie's daughter who, until the fifth film, is a teenage girl living with her mother
Christine Willes as Doris, Maggie's mother who lives with her
Shannon Chan-Kent as Lucy, Henry's devoted assistant
Brenda Crichlow as Dr. Erica Nolan, the Medical Examiner who works with the Police Department
Bruce Boxleitner as Jim Ross, Henry's father who was a retired policemen

Production and filming
The series is filmed in Vancouver, British Columbia, with production based in Victoria on Vancouver Island. The first film in the series featured the English Inn in Esquimalt as a five-star restaurant. Scenes from the fourth film in the series, Eat, Drink and Be Buried were filmed in Oak Bay and near Trafalgar Park.

Films

References

External links

2010s mystery films
2020s mystery films

American film series
American mystery films
Canadian film series
Canadian mystery films
Canadian television films
Hallmark Channel original programming
Hallmark Channel original films
Films based on American novels
Films shot in Vancouver
Films set in San Francisco
2010s American films
2010s Canadian films
2020s American films